Raili Hoviniemi (born 13 May 1936) is a Finnish gymnast. She competed in seven events at the 1952 Summer Olympics.

References

External links
 

1936 births
Living people
Finnish female artistic gymnasts
Olympic gymnasts of Finland
Gymnasts at the 1952 Summer Olympics
People from Joensuu
Sportspeople from North Karelia
20th-century Finnish women